Mahehia is a genus of woodlice in the family Porcellionidae, which is endemic to the Seychelles. It contains the following species:

Mahehia bicornis Budde-Lund, 1913
Mahehia laticauda Budde-Lund, 1913
Mahehia maculata Budde-Lund, 1913

References

Porcellionidae
Fauna of Seychelles
Endemic fauna of Seychelles